Konstantin Petrovich Ponomarev (born 17 October 1992) is a Russian professional boxer in the welterweight division.

Ponomarev made his debut on at the age of 17, without much of an amateur background. He fought under promotional outfit Ural Boxing Promotions. At 18, he moved to Mexico and briefly trained with Ignacio Beristáin. In 2014, Ponomarev signed with Top Rank. Ponomarev started training with Gennady Golovkin's trainer, Abel Sanchez, shortly after. He defeated Cosme Rivera by unanimous decision (100-90, 100–90, 98–82) in his first fight under the American promotion. In May 2015, Ponomarev claimed the NABF title, beating Mikaël Zewski by unanimous decision (99-91, 98–92, 97–93).

In 2016, the IBF ordered an eliminator between Errol Spence and Ponomarev. Ponomarev and Top Rank ultimately decided to not partake in the eliminator and Spence ended up facing Leonard Bundu in an eliminator. In July 2017, the IBF ordered a title eliminator between Carlos Ocampo and Ponomarev. The winner will be the mandatory challenger to Spence, who had become the IBF's champion. The fight was later called off as Ponomarev pulled out for undisclosed reasons.

On the 21st of July 2018 Sergey Vorobiev ended Ponomarev's undefeated streak.

References

1992 births
Living people
Russian male boxers
Welterweight boxers
People from Miass
Middleweight boxers
Sportspeople from Chelyabinsk Oblast